Darkness in Your Life is a four-song CD EP by West German synthpop/pop group Crown of Creation. It was released on August 18, 2010, and produced by Adrian Lesch.

Track listing
"Darkness in Your Life" was written by Anne Crönert and Adrian Lesch. "Run away" is written by Sabine Mertens. "Fallen Angel" is written by Thomas Czacharowski. "Frustsong" is written by Silke Kasten, Matthias Blazek and Rick J. Jordan.

Personnel

Crown of Creation
Anne Crönert: Vocals
Matthias Blazek: Synthesizer
Thomas Czacharowski: Synthesizer
Adrian Lesch: Synthesizer
Olaf Oppermann: Guitar

Production
Produced by Adrian Lesch in Hannover-Ahlem 
Recorded & Engineered by Adrian Lesch
Technical Assistance: Thomas Czacharowski
Mixed by Adrian Lesch

Tracks on samplers
 2012: Celle's Integrationsprojekt präsentiert: Made in Ce (with Run away), sampler dedicated to the Children's hospice in the Landkreis Celle

References

External links
 Official website 
 “Darkness in your Life” im Netz  
 Neue CD nach langer Pause , Cellesche Zeitung, August 20, 2010 

2010 albums
Crown of Creation (band) albums